Tiprenolol is a beta adrenergic receptor antagonist.

References

Beta blockers
Thioethers
N-isopropyl-phenoxypropanolamines